Michael Wawelberg (Михаил Ипполитович Вавельберг; 1880 – 19 July 1947) was a Polish-Russian Jewish banker, one of the best known members of the Wawelberg banking family.

Michael Wawelberg received a classical educational at the St. Nicholas Imperial Gymnasium in Tsarskoe Selo (Царскосельская Императорская Николаевская гимназия), from which he graduated in 1899. His father Hyppolite Wawelberg  donated 500 roubles for the gymnasium's own charity, which at the time was a considerable sum of money.

in 1903 Michael Wawelberg graduated from the University of St. Petersburg law school. That year he also took over the management of the Wawelberg Bank, which in 1912 was renamed the St. Petersburg Commercial Bank  (Петербургский Торговый банк). In 1913 a branch was founded in Poland and became a publicly traded company – the Western Bank (Bank Zachodni) in Poland.

According to the legend after one of his new bank buildings was constructed and Michael Wawelberg inspected it and could not find any deficiency with the work, he ordered to change the doors anyway because the door sign said "push." That's not what I do in life, said Wawelberg, I only pull things toward myself.

In 1917 on the eve of the Bolshevik putsch Michael Wawelberg lived in  Czarskoe Selo at 66 Boulvardnaia ulitsa (66 Boulevard Street, ул. Бульварая, 66, Soviet name Октябрьский бульвар, Oktiabr'skii Boulevard). He was the chairman of the Commercial Bank and director of the board of Donetsk and Grushev Coal and Anthracite Mines (директор  правления Донецко-Грушевского акционерного общества каменно-угольных и антрацитовых копий).

He fled Russia after 1917 and then disappears from the public view. Most likely he settled in Poland or spent some time there, because in Andrei Serkov's book on Russian Free Masonry  he mentions that two free masons, Alexander Erdman and Michael Wawelberg (М. И. Вавельберг), as they considered themselves Russian,  petitioned Grand Manster of the Polish Lodge with a request to allow them to found the Russian Lodge in Warsaw.

External links

1880 births
20th-century deaths
Bankers from the Russian Empire
Polish bankers